Istanbul's Central Business District as the real estate industry refers to it, is not the historic city center, but a 7-km-long north–south corridor of modern areas mostly along Barbaros Boulevard and Büyükdere Avenue. As of late 2021, 33% of the Class A office space in the metropolitan area was located in the CBD, of which about 790,000 sqm in Maslak, 690,000 sqm in Levent, 500,000 sqm in Zincirlikuyu/Esentepe/Gayrettepe and 100,000 sqm in Etiler.

The Istanbul Metro's  Line 2 serves the CBD's main north-south corridor, with Line 6 and Line 7 providing east-west service. In addition, Line 7 is to be extended southward from Şişli—Mecidiyeköy station to Beşiktaş ferry station.

The historic city center is in Fatih and contains historic sites, the Grand Bazaar and adjacent wholesale/retail districts, but is not a modern "central business district" in that it does not have modern retail formats, dense residential and hotel towers, etc. 

These can be found in the following edge cities with concentrations of office space, shopping malls, residential towers, entertainment and educational facilities, hospitals, etc.

From south to north, they are:
Beşiktaş district: 
Balmumcu
Gayrettepe incl. Profilo, Astoria and Trump Towers (Trump Alışveriş Merkezi) complexes
Etiler including Boğaziçi University
Şişli district: 
Fulya, Otim, Cumhuriyeti and the Şişli Merkez/Bomonti neighborhoods incl. the İstanbul Cevahir complex
Esentepe including Zincirlikuyu and the Zorlu Center complex
Levent including the Metrocity, Kanyon, Özdilekpark and Istanbul Sapphire complexes
Sarıyer district:
Maslak including the İstinye Park complex and the Istanbul Technical University
the Vadistanbul mall and office complexes in Ayazağa

Gallery

References

Geography of Istanbul

Edge cities in Turkey